Reginald "Reggie" or "R. F." Frank Doherty (14 October 1872 – 29 December 1910) was a British tennis player and the older brother of tennis player Laurence Doherty. He was known in the tennis world as "R.F." rather than "Reggie". He was a four-time Wimbledon singles champion and a triple Olympic Gold medalist in doubles and mixed doubles.

Early life
Doherty was born on 14 October 1872 at Beulah Villa in Wimbledon, the oldest son of William Doherty, a printer, and his wife Catherine Ann Davis. Doherty began tennis early in life and as a boy at Westminster School showed great promise. At age 14, he won the boys' singles title at an open championship in Llandudno. Doherty was educated at the University of Cambridge (Trinity Hall), where he played for the Cambridge University Lawn Tennis Club. In 1895 and 1895, he was part of the Cambridge team that beat Oxford and won the Scottish and Essex championships.

Career

Grand Slam tournaments

Doherty played in his first Wimbledon Championships in 1894 and lost in the first round to Clement Cazalet in four sets. In 1897 Doherty won his first singles Wimbledon title after beating reigning champion Harold Mahony in three straight sets (6–4, 6–4, 6–3). He successfully defended his title for the next three years (1898, 1899, 1900). In 1898 he did so by beating his brother in the Challenge Round in five sets (6–3, 6–3, 2–6, 5–7, 6–1). In 1901 he finally lost his Wimbledon crown when he was defeated in the Challenge Round by Arthur Gore in four sets (6–4, 5–7, 4–6, 4–6). He was also a runner-up at the US Championships in 1902 where he was beaten by the defending American champion William Larned in four sets (6–4, 2–6, 4–6, 6–8). Together with his brother Laurie he won eight Wimbledon Championships doubles titles and two US Championship doubles titles.

Davis Cup

Doherty represented the British Isles in the prestigious Davis Cup contest from 1902 to 1906. In 1902 he won the doubles match with his brother but lost the final and decisive singles match against American Malcolm Whitman in straight sets (1–6, 5–7, 4–6). In 1903 he contributed significantly to his team's first Davis Cup title against the United States by winning the doubles match and the decisive singles match against Robert Wrenn. Doherty won the Davis Cup trophy a further three times (1904, 1905, 1906) although in these years he only competed, and won, in the doubles matches.

Olympics

Doherty won the doubles title (gold medals were not given at the 1900 Games) at the 1900 Olympic Games in Paris with his brother. He also competed in the singles tournament and reached the semifinal, where he was scheduled to play against his brother. Reggie withdrew, since the brothers refused to play each other before the final. He also won the mixed doubles title with five-time Wimbledon champion Charlotte Cooper. Doherty did not compete in the 1904 Olympics in St. Louis. In the 1908 Olympics in London, Reggie again won the doubles title, this time with compatriot George Hillyard.

R.F. Doherty was inducted into the International Tennis Hall of Fame in 1980 together with his brother.

Death
Doherty died of heart failure and neurasthenia on 29 December 1910 at age 38 at his home in Kensington, a day after returning from a convalescence stay in a sanatorium in Davos, Switzerland.

According to his obituary in The New York Times, Doherty had "been in ill health for some time". The article further stated he "held at various times every important championship the world of tennis has for a man to win. He was not beaten until he began to fail in health". Both brothers apparently suffered from respiratory problems throughout their lives.

R.F. and his brother had been urged to take up lawn tennis by their father, reportedly for health reasons.

Grand Slam finals

Singles: 6 (4 titles, 2 runners-up)

Doubles: 13 (10 titles, 3 runners-up)

Career tournaments

Singles titles

Singles finals

References

External links

 
 
 
 
 

1872 births
1910 deaths
19th-century English people
19th-century male tennis players
Alumni of Trinity Hall, Cambridge
English people of Irish descent
English male tennis players
English Olympic medallists
Olympic bronze medallists for Great Britain
Olympic gold medallists for Great Britain
Olympic tennis players of Great Britain
Tennis people from Greater London
International Tennis Hall of Fame inductees
Tennis players at the 1900 Summer Olympics
Tennis players at the 1908 Summer Olympics
United States National champions (tennis)
Wimbledon champions (pre-Open Era)
Olympic medalists in tennis
Grand Slam (tennis) champions in men's singles
Grand Slam (tennis) champions in men's doubles
Medalists at the 1900 Summer Olympics
Medalists at the 1908 Summer Olympics
British male tennis players